This is a list of varieties of tteok, traditional rice cakes in Korean cuisine.

Steamed tteok

 Sirutteok (시루떡), steamed tteok
 Duteop tteok (두텁떡) - a variety of royal court tteok (궁중떡), is covered 3 layers - duteop powder [outside, made of black-line white bean (흰팥)], sweet rice [middle], and variety nuts and fruits [inside, including chestnut, date (jujube), pinenut, yuja, duteop-so]
 Baekseolgi (백설기) – a variety of siru tteok. It literally means "white snow tteok", and is made of white rice and whole raisins
 Kongtteok (콩떡) – tteok made with various kinds of beans
 Jeungpyeon (증편) – tteok made with makgeolli (unfiltered rice wine)
 Mujigae tteok (무지개떡) – literally "rainbow tteok"; this variety of tteok has colorful stripes. The tteok is used especially for janchi (잔치), Korean banquet, party, or feast like dol (celebrating a baby's first birthday), Hwangap (celebrating 60 years old people's birthday), or gyeonhon janchi (wedding party).

Pounded tteok
Injeolmi (인절미)
Pat injeolmi (팥인절미) - tteok made with azuki beans (팥)
Kkaeinjeolmi (깨인절미) - tteok made with black sesame (검은깨)
Ssuk injeolmi (쑥인절미) - tteok made with Artemisia princeps var. orientalis
Surichwi injeolmi (수리취인절미) - tteok made with Synurus deltoides (AIT.) NAKAI
Garaetteok (가래떡; also called hwin tteok, 흰떡, literally "white tteok") – tteok formed into a long white cylinder. The thinly sliced garae tteok is used for making tteokguk, while the thicker cylinder shaped tteok is used in tteokbokki

Shaped tteok

Kkul tteok (꿀떡) – literally means "honey" but this tteok is stuffed with Korean syrup. Ggul tteok is similar to songpyeon in shape, but smaller in size
Songpyeon (송편) – eaten during the Chuseok holiday
Gochitteok (고치떡) - made with strawberry powder, Artemisia princeps var. orientalis (쑥) and gardenia seeds (치자)
Ssamtteok (쌈떡) – tteok used for ssam (쌈, food wrapped in a leaf)
Dalgal tteok (닭알떡)  – named after the Korean word for egg (달걀 or 계란)
Gyeongdan (경단) – inside these rice balls are usually azuki bean or sesame paste. Then they are usually dipped and covered in black sesame or other powders.
Bupyeon (부편), consists of a dough made from glutinous rice flour with a sweet filling that is covered with gomul, a kind of powdered bean.

Pan-fried tteok

Hwajeon (화전) – small sweet pancakes made of glutinous rice flour and flower petals of Korean azalea, chrysanthemum, or rose
Bukkumi (부꾸미), pan-fried sweet tteok with various fillings in a crescent shape
Juak (주악), made of glutinous rice flour and stuffed with fillings such as mushrooms, jujubes, and chestnuts, and pan-fried. Juak are colored with natural coloring and covered with sugar or coated in honey

Non-rice tteok

Tteok-galbi (떡갈비) is made of formed minced rib meat, or galbi (갈비). The name literally translates to "cake ribs" and is a metaphorical reference to the process of kneading and shaping rice-based tteok.

See also
 List of Korean desserts

References

External links

Dessert-related lists
Korean cuisine-related lists